May 29 - Eastern Orthodox Church calendar - May 31

All fixed commemorations below celebrated on June 12 by Orthodox Churches on the Old Calendar.

For May 30th, Orthodox Churches on the Old Calendar commemorate the Saints listed on May 17.

Saints
 Martyrs Aphrodisius, Agapius, Eusebios, Charalampos and Christina, in Nicomedia, by fire (65)  (see also April 28 - West) 
 Hieromartyr Eutychius, disciple of St. John the Theologian (1st century) (see also August 24)
 Martyrs Romanos and Teletios, in Nicomedia, by the sword.
 Martyr Euplius (Efplos). 
 Martyr Natalios, by the sword. 
 Venerable Martyr Barlaam, of Caesarea in Cappadocia (c. 303–305) 
 Saint Cyprian of Antioch, reposed in peace. 
 Saint Macrina the Elder, grandmother of St. Basil the Great (340)
 Saint Emmelia of Caesarea, mother of Saint Basil the Great (375) (see also January 1 )
 Venerable Isaac the Confessor, founder of the Dalmatian Monastery at Constantinople (383)

Pre-Schism Western saints
 Martyrs Gabinus and Crispulus, at Torres in Sardinia, Protomartyrs of Sardinia (130)
 Pope Saint Felix I, who was the first to condemn the heresy of Paul of Samosata (274)
 Saint Venantius of Gaul, elder brother of St Honoratus of Lérins (374)
 Saint Exuperantius (Esuperantio), Bishop of Ravenna and Confessor (418)
 Saint Madelgisilus, Irish saint, disciple of St Fursey (655)
 Saint Anastasius of Pavia (680)
 Saint Hubert (Hugbert of Bretigny, Hubert of Maastricht), the "Apostle of the Ardennes", first Bishop of Liège (727)
 Saint Gamo, monk and then Abbot of Brétigny near Noyon in France (8th century)
 Saint Walstan, a farm labourer in Taverham and Costessey, remarkable for his charity (1016)

Post-Schism Orthodox saints
 Saint James, monk of Starotorzhok in Galich, Kostroma (15th-16th century)
 Venerables Isaiah and Nikanor of Arkhangel'sk (16th-17th century)

New martyrs and confessors
 Hieromartyr Basil, Priest (1942)

Other commemorations
 Consecration of the Church of St. Euphemia in Dexiokratiana, Constantinople.
 Repose of Abbot Ephraim of Sarov (1778)
 Repose of Hieromonk Benedict (Ghius) of Romania (1990)

Icon gallery

Notes

References

Sources 
 May 30/June 12. Orthodox Calendar (PRAVOSLAVIE.RU).
 June 12 / May 30. HOLY TRINITY RUSSIAN ORTHODOX CHURCH (A parish of the Patriarchate of Moscow).
 Complete List of Saints. Protection of the Mother of God Church (POMOG).
 May 30. OCA - The Lives of the Saints.
 Dr. Alexander Roman. May. Calendar of Ukrainian Orthodox Saints (Ukrainian Orthodoxy - Українське Православ'я).
 May 30. Latin Saints of the Orthodox Patriarchate of Rome.
 May 30. The Roman Martyrology.
Greek Sources
 Great Synaxaristes:  30 ΜΑΪΟΥ. ΜΕΓΑΣ ΣΥΝΑΞΑΡΙΣΤΗΣ.
  Συναξαριστής. 30 Μαΐου. ECCLESIA.GR. (H ΕΚΚΛΗΣΙΑ ΤΗΣ ΕΛΛΑΔΟΣ). 
Russian Sources
  12 июня (30 мая). Православная Энциклопедия под редакцией Патриарха Московского и всея Руси Кирилла (электронная версия). (Orthodox Encyclopedia - Pravenc.ru).
  30 мая (ст.ст.) 12 июня 2013 (нов. ст.). Русская Православная Церковь Отдел внешних церковных связей. (DECR).

May in the Eastern Orthodox calendar